St Mark's Church, Derby is a parish church in the Church of England in Chaddesden, Derbyshire.

History

In 1897 a small corrugated iron church was erected at the junction of Francis Street and St Mark's Road, Derby.
 
The foundation stone for the permanent church was laid on 5 January 1935 by Edith Haslam of Breadsall Priory. The contractor for the construction was J.K. Ford and Weston of Osmaston Road, Derby. The cost was £11,000. It was opened on 18 December 1935.

The church is ambulatory. There is a series of eight parabolic arches united by reinforced concrete beams at ground level, ambulatory level and roof level, these form the skeleton of the building.

The church is in a joint parish with St Philip's Church, Chaddesden.

Organ

The church has a pipe organ by Kingsgate Davidson dating from 1935. A specification of the organ can be found on the National Pipe Organ Register.

References

Church of England church buildings in Derbyshire
Churches completed in 1935